Burmazi is a village in the municipalities of Berkovići, Republika Srpska, and Stolac, Bosnia and Herzegovina.

Demographics 
According to the 2013 census, its population was nil in the Berkovići part and 223 in the Stolac part.

References

Populated places in Berkovići
Populated places in Stolac
Villages in the Federation of Bosnia and Herzegovina